Fargher Lake is an unincorporated community in Clark County, Washington, United States.

The settlement, as well as a former lake located nearby, both share the name "Fargher Lake".

History
The lake was originally named Hard Hack Swamp.  Brothers Arthur Wellesly, Fredrick Daniel and Horatio Albert Fargher emigrated in the 1870s from their birthland the Isle of Man and settled for a while near the lake. 

The lake and surrounding area was renamed Fargher Lake, and the lake was drained sometime during the early 1960s. The drained lake bed was used then for farming and currently contains blueberry fields.

References

Unincorporated communities in Clark County, Washington
Unincorporated communities in Washington (state)